George Hazard (9 October 1700 - 1738) was a deputy governor of the Colony of Rhode Island and Providence Plantations.

Life 

George Hazard was the son of George and Penelope (Arnold) Hazard of South Kingstown in the Rhode Island colony.  His grandfather was Robert Hazard of Portsmouth, and his great grandfather was Thomas Hazard who settled in Portsmouth by way of Boston.  The subject George Hazard became a freeman of South Kingstown in 1721, a Deputy in 1729, serving for five years in that capacity, and in 1733 was Speaker of the House of Deputies.  In 1734 he was elected as Deputy Governor of the colony, serving until his death in 1738.

In 1733 Hazard paid £1,000 to his father for a farm called the "Foddering Place," and built a large mansion house there.  In his will he left this farm to his son, also named George Hazard, who would become the Mayor of Newport Another son, Carder Hazard, served on the Rhode Island Supreme Court.

Hazard's wife, Sarah, the daughter of James and Mary (Whipple) Carder, also died in 1738, shortly after Hazard's death which was likely in the spring of 1738, since his will was recorded on 22 May of that year.  The couple had seven children.  Hazard's mother, Penelope Arnold, was a daughter of Caleb and Abigail (Wilbur) Arnold, and a granddaughter of Governor Benedict Arnold, and of Samuel Wilbur, Jr.  She was also a great granddaughter of two signers of the Portsmouth Compact, John Porter and Samuel Wilbore.  Hazard's first cousin, Robert Hazard, later became deputy governor of the colony.

Ancestry 

Most of the given ancestry of Hazard is found in John O. Austin's Genealogical Dictionary of Rhode Island.  The early Brownell line is found online.

See also 

 List of lieutenant governors of Rhode Island
 List of colonial governors of Rhode Island
 Colony of Rhode Island and Providence Plantations

References

Bibliography

Further reading

External links 
State list of lieutenant governors of Rhode Island

1700 births
1738 deaths
American people of English descent
People from South Kingstown, Rhode Island
People of colonial Rhode Island
Hazard family of Rhode Island